Yawal is a taluka, city and a municipal council in Jalgaon, Maharashtra, India.

Geography
Yawal has 1 river {Sur river} with 2 tributaries, (Harita and Sarita a.k.a. Hadkai and Khadkai).
In the stream of Suki River Suresh Chopane, Geologist from Chandrapur discovered Columnar Basalt in August 2021.This is a rare Geological formation. Yawal taluka consists of Atrawal, Kingaon, Anjale, Amoda, Sakali, Faizpur, Sangavi Bk, Nhavi, Korpawali, Haripura, Viravali and many other villages.

Demographics
Yawal have a Hindu Population of 68.28%, followers of Islam is 26.19%, Buddhism Religion followers are 3.89 and other religion citizens are 1.64% as of May-2022

Politics
Yawal is also a taluka city in the district of Jalgaon, Maharashtra. The Yawal city is divided into 19 wards for which elections are held every 5 years. The Yawal Municipal Council has a population of 36,706 of which 18,965 are males while 17,741 are females as per report released by Census India 2011. Yawal Municipal Council has total administration over 7,363 houses to which it supplies basic amenities like water and sewerage.

Transport
Yawal is located on the Burhanpur-Ankaleshwer MH SH 4. The nearest main railway station is Bhusawal which is just 18 km. The nearest airport to Yawal is Jalgaon Airport which is just 45  km away.

Temples

 Shree Jagatguru Ved Maharshi Vyas Muni Mandir. He wrote the Mahabharata.
 Tarkeshwar Mandir.

It has a fort said to have belonged to the Sansthanik Raje Nimbalkar. Gavali Wadaa has a 9–10 km long wall.

Yawal Taluka(Tehsil)
Yawal is a city with tehsil headquarter in Jalgaon district of Maharashtra state in india. In Yawal taluka there is 91 villages and 2 towns(Yawal & Faizpur). 

According to india census 2011, population of yawal taluka was 2,72,242. In which, 23.3% people lives in Urban areas and 76.7% lives in the Rural areas.

See also

 Jalgaon
 Raver
 Yawal Fort

References

Talukas in Maharashtra
Cities and towns in Jalgaon district